A drainage basin is an extent of land where water from rain and melting snow or ice drains downhill into a body of water, such as a river, lake, reservoir, estuary, wetland, sea or ocean. The drainage basin includes both the streams and rivers that convey the water as well as the land surfaces from which water drains into those channels, and is separated from adjacent basins by a drainage divide.

The drainage basin acts like a funnel, collecting all the water within the area covered by the basin and channelling it into a waterway. Each drainage basin is separated topographically from adjacent basins by a geographical barrier such as a ridge, hill or mountain, which is known as a water divide.

Other terms that are used to describe a drainage basin are catchment, catchment area, catchment basin, drainage area, river basin, water basin and watershed.

The drainage basins in South Africa do not correspond with the Water Management Areas, and have the letters A, B, C, D, E, F, G, H, J, K, L, M, N, P, Q, R, S, T, U, V, W, and X. The Area A comes close to the same area that the Limpopo WMA seems to cover. Apart from these letters they seem to have no name referring to them. What seems to be the case though is that each area refers to some major river systems and their tributaries (a region for each major river system). 

List of drainage basins

A  Drainage basin code assigned by the Department of Water Affairs (South Africa); see  for details.
B  The  Limpopo River Basin is not wholly located within South Africa, it straddles four countries, Botswana, Mozambique, South Africa and Zimbabwe.
C  The Tugela and Vaal drainage basins are linked with the Tugela-Vaal Water Project, an interbasin transfer scheme across the Drakensberg watershed that supplies additional water to the Vaal River when required. The Drakensberg Pumped Storage Scheme forms an integral part of this scheme.
D  The Gariep Dam on the Orange River basin is linked via the Great Fish River basin to the Sundays River basin by the Fish-Sundays Transfer Scheme.

See also 
 Drainage basin
 List of reservoirs and dams in South Africa
 List of rivers of South Africa
 Water Management Areas
 Geography of South Africa

References

External links
 Hydrology
 Map where one can zoom into a drainage system
FROC - Reference frequency of occurrence of fish species in South Africa

Drainage basins
Water in South Africa
South Africa